Bonanno is an Italian surname. Notable people with the surname include:

 Bonanno crime family, a Mafia family in New York City
 Joseph Bonanno (1905–2002), founder
 Salvatore Bonanno (1932–2008), son of Joseph
 Alfio Bonanno (born 1976), Australian-Italian tenor, songwriter, musician, and composer
 Alfredo M. Bonanno (born 1937), Italian anarchist
 Anthony Bonanno, Maltese archeologist
 Benny Bonanno, a former member of the Ohio House of Representatives, and Cuyahoga County Clerk of Courts
 George Bonanno, American clinical psychologist and pioneer of bereavement research
 Giovanna Bonanno (c. 1713 – 1789), Italian alleged witch and poisoner
 Joseph A. Bonanno, American optometrist 
 Kathleen Sheeder Bonanno (1956–2017), American poet, teacher, and contributing editor to The American Poetry Review
 Margaret Wander Bonanno (1950–2021), science fiction author
 Mike Bonanno, multimedia artist, leading member of The Yes Men
 Nicholas Bonanno (1927–2002), organizer, regional director and Vice-President of the ILGWU 
 Nicolás Bonanno (born 1991), Argentine handball player 
 Robin Bonanno (born 1962), American race car driver 
 Salvatore Vincent "Bill" Bonanno (1932–2008), the son of Cosa Nostra boss Joseph Bonanno

See also
 Bonanno Pisano
 Bonanno: A Godfather's Story, a 1999 biopic based on the memoirs of Joseph and Bill Bonanno

Italian-language surnames